K-192 is a  east–west state highway in the U.S. state of Kansas. K-192's western terminus is at U.S. Route 59 (US-59) and K-16 west-northwest of Winchester and the eastern terminus is at US-73 and K-7 west-northwest of Leavenworth. K-192 travels mostly through rural land but does pass through the cities of Winchester and Easton.

Before state highways were numbered in Kansas there were auto trails. The former Corn Belt Route and South West Trail closely followed the highways western terminus. The former George Washington National Highway and King of Trails followed the highways eastern terminus. K-192 was first designated a state highway on January 4, 1939. In 1964, the western terminus was shortened slightly when a new alignment of US-59 was built, and then in 1999, the eastern terminus was shortened when US-73 was moved to a new alignment.

Route description
The Kansas Department of Transportation (KDOT) tracks the traffic levels on its highways, and in 2017, they determined that on average the traffic varied from 625 vehicles per day slightly east of Winchester to 2280 vehicles per day near the eastern terminus. K-192 is not included in the National Highway System, which is a system of highways important to the nation's defense, economy, and mobility. K-192 does connect to the National Highway System at its eastern and western terminus. The majority of the route is paved with partial design bituminous pavement except for the segment within the Easton city limits, which is full design bituminous pavement.

Jefferson County
K-192 begins at an intersection with US-59 and K-16 west-northwest of Winchester. The highway crosses Crooked Creek and begins traveling east through flat rural farmlands. After roughly  it curves to the south at an intersection with Saline Road. It continues south for  then curves east and enters the city of Winchester as Delaware Street. K-192 continues through the city and passes Covenanter Cemetery and after approximately  exits the city. The roadway continues north for  then curves back east.

Leavenworth County
After entering Leavenworth County, K-192 continues east through flat lands for roughly  then curves northeastward. Here the landscape transitions to lightly forested rolling hills as it continues northeastward. The highway soon crosses Dawson Creek then passes by Lawrence Cemetery as it curves back to the east. The highway then curves southeast at Potter Road and becomes Dawson Street. It then enters Easton and turns east onto Riley Street. The highway continues along Riley Street for about  then exits the city. K-192 then crosses Stranger Creek and curves northeast. From here the road continues  then curves north at Seven Sisters Road. After curving north it travels  then turns back east at 207 Street.

History
Before state highways were numbered in Kansas there were auto trails, which were an informal network of marked routes that existed in the United States and Canada in the early part of the 20th century. The former Corn Belt Route and South West Trail closely followed the highways western terminus. The former George Washington National Highway and King of Trails followed the highways eastern terminus.

K-192 was first designated a state highway on January 4, 1939, by the State Highway Commission of Kansas, now known as KDOT. On August 12, 1964, the western terminus of K-192 was truncated  when US-59 was moved onto a new alignment slightly east. In a March 9, 1990 resolution, the eastern terminus of K-192 was truncated  when US-73 and K-7 were moved onto a new alignment between Leavenworth and Lowemont.

Major intersections

References

External links

Kansas Department of Transportation State Map
KDOT: Historic State Maps

192
Transportation in Jefferson County, Kansas
Transportation in Leavenworth County, Kansas